Matti Sutinen (born 31 January 1930) is a Finnish athlete. He competed in the men's pole vault at the 1956 Summer Olympics and the 1960 Summer Olympics.

References

1930 births
Living people
Sportspeople from Vyborg
Finnish male pole vaulters
Olympic athletes of Finland
Athletes (track and field) at the 1956 Summer Olympics
Athletes (track and field) at the 1960 Summer Olympics